Okinawa currently sends 8 elected members to the Diet of Japan, 6 to the House of Representatives and 2 to the House of Councillors.

House of Representatives 
The current House of Representatives Okinawa delegation consists of 2 members of the LDP, 1 JCP, 1 SDP, 1 LP and 1 NIK.

District seats

PR seats 
Okinawa Prefecture is part of the Kyushu proportional representation block. In the current Diet, there are two Representatives from Okinawa elected through the Kyushu PR block.

House of Councillors 
The current House of Councillors Okinawa delegation consists of 2 independent members. Both are members of the Okinawa Whirlwind caucus in the House. The members are elected from the Okinawa at-large district.

References 

Politics of Okinawa
Parliamentary districts of the Diet of Japan by prefecture
Districts of the House of Representatives (Japan)
Districts of the House of Councillors (Japan)